German submarine U-53 was a Type VIIB U-boat of Nazi Germany's Kriegsmarine during World War II. She was laid down on 13 March 1937 at Friedrich Krupp Germaniawerft in Kiel and went into service on 24 June 1939 under the command of Oberleutnant zur See (Oblt.z.S.) Dietrich Knorr.

Design
German Type VIIB submarines were preceded by the shorter Type VIIA submarines. U-53 had a displacement of  when at the surface and  while submerged. She had two shafts and two  propellers.

U-53 was fitted with five  torpedo tubes (four fitted at the bow and one at the stern), fourteen torpedoes, one  SK C/35 naval gun, 220 rounds, and one  anti-aircraft gun The boat had a complement of between forty-four and sixty.

Service history

First patrol

U-53 began her first patrol on 29 August 1939, just prior to the outbreak of the Second World War, under the command of Ernst-Günter Heinicke. Also aboard was Ernst Sobe, the commander of the 7th ("Wegener") Flotilla. U-53 sank two British ships on this patrol: the tanker SS Cheyenne and the freighter SS Kafiristan.

Second patrol

A second patrol under Heinicke, beginning on 21 October produced no results. Daunted by the strong British forces at the straits, Heinicke did not attempt to force them and was transferred to the merchant raider  on his return to Germany.

Third patrol

Harald Grosse replaced Heinicke for U-53s third and final war patrol, which began on 2 February 1940.

In popular culture
In the 1953 film The Cruel Sea U53 was the last (of two) submarine the crew of the fictitious frigate HMS Saltash Castle sank.

In the film Eye of the Needle U-53 is the escape U-boat of the Needle (played by Donald Sutherland) waiting offshore. This is supposed to happen in 1944 in the timeline of the film.

In the 1958 film I Was Monty's Double U-53 is the U-boat which drops off the German commandos attempting to kidnap who they think is General Montgomery (actually his double played by M.E. Clifton James).

In the 1959 British comedy film Don't Panic Chaps U-53 is depicted as the submarine that surfaces to pick up the "stranded" German forces on an unnamed Adriatic Island.

Summary of raiding history

References

Bibliography

External links

German Type VIIB submarines
World War II submarines of Germany
World War II shipwrecks in the Atlantic Ocean
1939 ships
U-boats commissioned in 1939
Ships built in Kiel
Ships lost with all hands
U-boats sunk in 1940
U-boats sunk by British warships
U-boats sunk by depth charges
Maritime incidents in February 1940